Dobrinishte is a small town and ski resort in the Blagoevgrad Province, Bansko Municipality,  southwestern Bulgaria.  it has 2973 inhabitants. It is located 6 km east of Bansko, a famous winter resort. It has an altitude of 850 m and is surrounded by the Rila, Pirin, and Rhodope mountains. Dobrinishte offers good conditions for both winter and summer tourism: beautiful nature, hospitable population, ski runs, mineral waters and opportunities for rural and ecotourism. According to legends and song, between 6th and 15th century Dobrinishte was a Bulgarian stronghold which halted the Byzantines from invading the country from the valley of the Mesta River.

Dobrinishte is also a terminal station of the scenic Septemvri-Dobrinishte narrow gauge line from Septemvri (on the Sofia-Plovdiv line).

The village is a famous spa resort with 17 mineral springs with temperatures of 30-43 °C. The water is used to cure different diseases.

External links

 All about Dobrinishte
 Properties in Dobrinishte

Populated places in Blagoevgrad Province
Towns in Bulgaria
Spa towns in Bulgaria
Ski areas and resorts in Bulgaria